The 2022 NC State Wolfpack women's soccer team represented NC State University during the 2022 NCAA Division I women's soccer season. The Wolfpack were led by head coach Tim Santoro, in his eleventh season. They played their home games at Dail Soccer Field. This was the team's 39th season playing organized women's college soccer and their 36th playing in the Atlantic Coast Conference.

The team finished 7–7–6 overall and 2–6–2 in ACC play to finish in eleventh place.  They did not qualify for the ACC Tournament.  There seven overall wins were their worst since 2015, excluding a shortened 2020.  They received an at-large bid to the NCAA Tournament.  As the eighth-seed in the UCLA Bracket they hosted  who was ranked #20 in the polls at the time.  The match ended in a 1–1 draw, but the Wolfpack lost the ensuing penalty shootout 4–2 to end their season.

Previous season 

The Wolfpack finished the season 9–9–2 overall and 4–6–0 in ACC play to finish in a tie for ninth place.  They did not qualify for the ACC Tournament.  They received an at-large bid to the NCAA Tournament.  As an unseeded team in the Florida State Bracket they defeated South Florida in the First Round before losing to fourth seed Pepperdine in the Second Round to end their season.

Offseason

Departures

Incoming Transfers

Recruiting Class

Source:

Squad

Roster

Team Management

Source:

Schedule

Source:

|-
!colspan=6 style=""| Exhibition

|-
!colspan=6 style=""| Non-Conference Regular season

|-
!colspan=6 style=""| ACC Regular season

|-
!colspan=6 style=""| NCAA Tournament

Rankings

Awards and honors

References

NC State
NC State
2021
NC State women's soccer
NC State